The 2010 World Team Championship (short WTC 2010) was the first edition of the World Team Championship which was sanctioned by the World Pool-Billiard Association, which ran from January 30, 2010 to February 6, 2010 in Hanover, Germany. A total prize fund of $398,000 was distributed, with the winning team receiving $100,000. The Great Britain 1 team of Darren Appleton, Daryl Peach, Imran Majid, Karl Boyes and Mark Gray won the event with a 4–1 victory over the Philippines. It was the first iteration of the World Team Championship.

In the quarter-finals, the match between Britain 1 and China reached a playoff. After a "titanic struggle", the match reached a score of 27–25 in a race to 6 racks with the winning rack from Peach.

Format
The World Team Championship consisteted of teams of 4-6 players for national teams. The event was organised and run by the World Pool-Billiard Association. Only one national team is allowed to compete per nation, with the exception of hosts Germany, Great Britain and Israel. The latter two were re-nominated after the teams from Nigeria and Brunei cancelled.

The event featured three pool disciplines for each match: Eight-ball, Nine-ball and 10-Ball. Each match consists of six matches; two each in the respective disciplines. The 8-ball sets are played in doubles to 6 racks. The 9-ball and 10-ball sets are played in singles on a playout of 8 or 7 racks. If a match is tied 3-3, the winner is determined by a playoff.

The tournament was contested as a Double-elimination tournament until 16 teams remained. In the final round of the last 16 will be in the Single-elimination tournament played, so every defeat leads to the immediate withdrawal from the tournament.

Prize money
The event featured a prize fund totalling $398,000, with $100,000 for the winners of the event split between the participants. A breakdown of the prize money is shown below:

Competing teams
Source:

Results

Round of 16 
After the double elimination round, a single elimination tournament featuring the last 16 teams was held. Below are the results from this stage:

Quarter-finals

Semi-finals

Final
{|
|

External links

References 

World Team Championship (pool)
Sports competitions in Hanover
2010 in cue sports
2010 in German sport
International sports competitions hosted by Germany
January 2010 sports events in Germany
February 2010 sports events in Germany